Gabi Martínez (born 1971) is a Spanish writer, screenwriter and journalist. He is considered one of the Spanish representatives of travel literature, with works such as Los mares de Wang, En la Barrera o Voy. He has also written novels and nonfiction books based on research. He received the 2012 Continuará award by Television Española in Catalonia for his literary career.

Works 
 Solo marroquí (Plaza & Janés 1999)
 Anticreta (Debolsillo, 1999)
 Diablo de Timanfaya (Debolsillo, 2000)
 Hora de Times Square (Mondadori, 2002)
 Ático (Destino, 2004)
 Una España inesperada (Poliedro, 2005)
 Sudd (Alfaguara, 2007)
 Los mares de Wang (Alfaguara, 2008)
 Sudd. Novela gráfica (Glénat, 2011)
 Solo para gigantes (Alfaguara, 2011)
 Voy (Alfaguara, 2014)
 Las defensas (Seix Barral, 2017)
 Animales invisibles (NordicaLibros, 2019)

References 

Writers from Barcelona
Living people
1971 births